Teller or telling may refer to:

People
 Teller (surname)
 Teller (magician), one half of the duo Penn & Teller

Places
 Teller, Alaska, United States
 Teller Airport
 Teller County, Colorado, United States

Other uses
 5006 Teller, a minor planet
 Bank teller
 Automated teller machine
 Teller (elections), a person who counts the votes in a vote
 Teller Amendment, a 1898 amendment to a joint resolution of the United States Congress
 Teller House, a historic hotel in Central City, Colorado
 Teller mine, a German-made antitank mine common in World War II
 Teller Peak, Antarctica
 The Tellers, a Belgian rock group
 The Telling, a 2000 science fiction novel by Ursula K. Le Guin
 Being an informant or snitch